Vital Kramko (born 1941) is the chairman of "October" (Октябрь), an agricultural collective located in the Hrodna region. Kramko was awarded the title Hero of Belarus title "for selfless work and valiant efforts in the development of agricultural production." Kramko was awarded the title on 30 June 2001 from a decree issued by Alexander Lukashenko.

References

1941 births
Living people
Belarusian inventors
National Heroes of Belarus